Ibraheem Yaqoub El-Zakzaky (alternately Ibraheem Zakzaky, Ibrahim Al-Zakzaky; born 5 May 1953) is a Nigerian religious leader. He is an imprisoned outspoken and prominent Shi'a Muslim leader in Nigeria.  He is the head of Nigeria's Islamic Movement, which he founded in the late 1970s, when a student at Ahmadu Bello University, and began propagating Shia Islam around 1979, at the time of the Iranian revolution—which saw Iran's monarchy overthrown and replaced with an Islamic republic under Ayatollah Khomeini.  Zakzaky believed that the establishment of a republic along similar religious lines in Nigeria would be feasible. He has been detained several times due to accusations of civil disobedience or recalcitrance under military regimes in Nigeria during the 1980s and 1990s, and is still viewed with suspicion or as a threat by Nigerian authorities. In December 2015, the Nigerian Army raided his residence in Zaria, seriously injured him, and killed hundreds of his followers. Since then, he has remained under state detention in the nation's capital pending his release, which was ordered in late 2016.
In 2019, a court in Kaduna state granted him and his wife bail to seek treatment abroad but they returned from India after 3 days on the premises of unfair treatment and tough restrictions by security operatives deployed to the medical facility.

Recently the Kaduna state higher court ordered his immediate release after 2,055 days of illegal detention almost six years. The DSS denied to give him his traveling documents for medical treatment till now.

Early life and education
Ibraheem Zakzaky was born on 5 May 1953 (15 Sha’ban 1372 AH), in Zaria, Kaduna State. He attended the Provincial Arabic School, Zaria (1969-1970), the School for Arabic Studies, Kano from 1971-1976, where he obtained the ‘Grade II’ Certificate, and the Ahmadu Bello University (ABU), Zaria (1976-1979), where he earned a first-class bachelor's degree in Economics. The degree was denied to him by the university authorities due to his Islamic activities.
During his university days, he was active in student Islamic unionism, where he became the secretary-general of the Muslim Students Society of Nigeria (MSSN) at the Main Campus of the university (1977/78), and later became  Vice President (International Affairs) of the National Body of the MSSN in 1979.
 The same year, he is said to have become so impressed with the 1979 Iranian Revolution that he wanted one at home. Later, Zakzaky went to Iran, ultimately becoming a Shia. At home, he became the leader of the Islamic Movement in Nigeria and turned it into a vehicle for proselytizing and gaining followers in the 1990s. As a result of his activities a significant number have converted to Shia Islam in a country once with hardly any Shia population.

Islamic Movement in Nigeria

Ibraheem Zakzaky is the primary figure and spiritual leader of the Islamic Movement in Nigeria (formerly: Muslim Brothers), Africa's most prominent Shi'a Muslim movement. Of Nigeria's 180 million population, around 50 percent are Muslim, a small minority of which belong to Shi'a Islam. According to Nnamdi Obasi, Senior Analyst on Nigeria at the International Crisis Group (ICG), the IMN's goals are twofold: “to ensure more stringent application of Islamic legal and administrative systems...then ultimately to create an Islamic state in Nigeria.”
Dr Iqbal Siddiqui described El-Zakzaky as "the de facto leader of the Islamic Movement in Nigeria".

Political alignment and activities
The Resource Forum of the Islamic Movement of Nigeria (IMN) held a symposium on "The Creation of the Illegal State of Israel" at Arewa House Kaduna on 21 May 2008. Zakzaky said,

Nigerian Army attacks against the movement

Zaria Quds day massacre

On Friday 25 July 2014
, the Nigerian Army reportedly fatally shot 35 followers of Ibrahim Zakzaky, including three of his sons, after a pro-Palestinian procession in Zaria. The UK Islamic Human Rights Commission published the report Zaria Massacres and the Role of the Military in October 2014.

2015 Zaria massacre
Sheikh al-Zakzaky was injured and arrested along with his wife, in the 2015 Zaria massacre, in which three of his remaining sons, as well as hundreds of his followers, were killed by the Nigerian Army.

Detention and ordered release
According to the judgment of the high court of Nigeria on 2 December 2016, Ibrahim Yaqoub El Zakzaky was ordered to be released from Department of State Services (similar to the US FBI detention) into police custody within 45 days.  El Zakzaky and his wife were to be paid the sum of 50 million Naira ($164,052) in compensation.  The judge announced that the justification of "holding him for his own protection" is not sufficient.

On 16 January 2017, Amnesty International demanded that the "Nigerian authorities must immediately comply with a High Court order and release Ibraheem El-Zakzaky and his wife from detention."

On 13 January 2018, Zakzaky, detained at an unknown location without charges since December 2015, made a short public appearance, his first in two years, being allowed to see his doctor. Since 2014, Zakzaky was held captive by Nigerian federal government and Kaduna State government for criminal charges, since then, many of his followers make a protest in all the state for his release. the act of detaining zakzaky long time without being judged was said to be against the law of the federation.

2019 clashes
On 22 January 2019, Zakzaky and his wife, Zeenat head to the Kaduna High Court for hearing on the bail application. They were guarded by heavily armed operatives as they made their way into the court.

In July 2019, in order to demand the release of  Ibraheem el-Zakzaky, hundreds of people gathered outside government buildings and policemen tried to disperse them by using gunshots and tear gas. During the clash, two people died and 40 protesters were arrested by police. The Islamic Movement of Nigeria (IMN), a group of  Nigeria's minority Shia Muslims, said protests will continue until they secure the release of el-Zakzaky, because he suffered another stroke on Monday and it is needed urgently for him to be flown abroad for medical treatment. Abdullahi Murtala, a security analyst said, "Shia Muslims are emboldened by the perceived injustice of an 'immoral state' and will continue their protest and show of defiance against the Buhari government".

Another clash with Nigerian police on 22 July claimed many lives both of the Shi'ites, police officers and a young reporter, Precious Owolabi under NYSC. A Deputy Commissioner of Police also lost his life during the clash.

The Muhammadu Buhari-led government proscribed the sect as illegal movement in Nigeria after meeting with service chiefs over the clash

Personal life
He is married to Zeenah Ibraheem, with whom he had nine children.
Currently, only three of his children (one son and two daughters) are living. Three of his sons were killed in the Zaria Quds Day massacres in 2014.  Three more sons were killed in the 2015 Zaria massacre. It said that he died on 12th December 2022 at the age of 69, but it is not confirmed yet. It was a rumor.

See also
 Tijaniyyah
 Shia Islam in Nigeria

References

External links

 Official website of the Islamic Movement (Nigeria)
 Islamic Movement In Nigeria
 Biography at Tripod

1953 births
Nigerian Shia clerics
Nigerian Shia Muslims
Converts to Shia Islam from Sunni Islam
Critics of Sunni Islam
Living people
People from Zaria
Ahmadu Bello University alumni
People from Kaduna State
Nigerian Muslim activists